The Adventures of Paddy the Pelican is an American animated television series that debuted on local stations in Chicago during the 1950s. It is exceedingly rare, but has gained some fame for appearing on Jerry Beck's Worst Cartoons Ever. On the DVD, Beck states that he has not found any evidence that this particular animated adaptation was aired on TV, although there is evidence that the Paddy the Pelican character began in 1950 as a local TV puppet show on Chicago's WENR-TV (now WLS-TV), with Helen York and Ray Suber as puppeteers.

Description
In the cartoon, Paddy's adventures were presented in comic strip drawings done by Sam Singer. This show appeared on the ABC network in the fall of 1950, but for only one month. The show aired on the ABC television network weekdays between 5:15 and 5:30pm from September 11, 1950 to October 13, 1950. Singer had also started producing a newspaper, Paddy Pelican Junior Journal. The animated episodes currently in existence all have copyright dates of 1954, but the copyright was never renewed, so the series is in the public domain today.

The show is noted for its pencil tests that were never finalized to the actual animation, reused animation, rambling and apparently improvised voiceovers by the creator himself, muffled and poorly synchronized soundtrack made by an organ, and general low-budget problems. The only music is a few chords played on an organ, although the title card is accompanied by a man making noises apparently intended to sound like a pelican squawking. Most of the characters were voiced by Singer, however one character was voiced by an uncredited actress.

Singer, who worked for Disney and other Hollywood animation studios, also produced a local children's television show, based on the Marshall Field's character "Uncle Mistletoe", as well as other early animated shows.

The theme music was composed by Charles A. Cavallo.

In October 2016, all the shorts were uploaded to YouTube. They were taken from the original 16mm prints and were transferred, then uploaded online.

Episodes

Merchandise
Sam Singer had a coloring book published called The Paddy Pelican Story and Coloring Mak-A-Book. The Michigan State University Library currently has a copy of this rare coloring book in their possession. It is also in the public domain.

Bibliography
 via Project MUSE

References

External links

1950s American animated television series
1950 American television series debuts
1950 American television series endings
American children's animated adventure television series
American children's animated comedy television series
Adventures of Paddy the Pelican
Fictional pelicans
Animated television series about birds